The Institute of Aviation or Warsaw Institute of Aviation (Polish Instytut Lotnictwa) is a research and development center established in 1926, located in Warsaw, Poland.

The activities of the facility focus on providing design, engineering and research services in the field of aviation and aerospace. The institute conducts international cooperation with European Union and transatlantic countries in the following areas (primarily with General Electric under the Engineering Design Center): aircraft engines, aerodynamics, aircraft structures and materials research. The Lukasiewicz Research Network - Aerospace Institute also collaborates with Boeing, Airbus and Pratt & Whitney and conducts research for other sectors of the economy. In 2019, the Institute joined the Lukasiewicz Research Network.

References

External links
 Official website of the Institute of Aviation
 Official website of the New Technologies Center (NTC)
 Official website of the Engineering Design Center (EDC)
 Official website of the Materials and Structures Research Centre (MSRC)
 Official website of the Net Institute (NET)
 Official website of The Age of Engineers

Aviation organisations based in Poland
Electrical engineering companies
Organizations established in 1926
aviation
Aviation research institutes
Research institutes in Poland